Gino Cappello (2 June 1920 – 28 March 1990) was an Italian footballer who played as a striker.

Club career
A native of Padua, Cappello began his career with Padova. After spending two seasons with the club in Serie B, he landed in Serie A with Milan in 1940. In the three seasons at Milan he was always the second leading scorer and unfortunately Milan was not a major title-contender at the time. After the war he went to Bologna where he played for ten straight seasons. He scored 80 goals in 245 games leaving a mark on the fans not to be forgotten. In his last two seasons he played for Novara in Serie B. In 1958, when he was still playing with Novara, he decided to retire having reached the age of forty.

International career
Cappello debuted for the Italian national team on 22 May 1949 in a 3–1 win against Austria. He was one of four players to play both games at the 1950 World Cup. Four years later he was also called up to the national team for the 1954 World Cup, where he wore the number 10 shirt, becoming the first Italian player to wear the iconic jersey in a World Cup as it was the first tournament which required players to wear numbers on their shirts. He played his last game for Italy in a 4–1 win against Belgium during the tournament.

Style of play
Despite not initially having the best technique as a youngster, Cappello later developed into a highly skilful and creative forward, who was known for his feints, close control and dribbling skills, as well as his poor work-rate and inconsistency. Initially an advanced playmaker or second striker, Cappello was capable of playing anywhere along the front-line, on either wing or even in the centre. An instinctive and opportunistic player, with an eye for goal, he naturally adapted to the centre forward position; his main characteristic was to become completely separated from the game for long periods, only to suddenly pull off a crucial assist or the winning goal with one of his only shots or touches of the match. Both genius and dissolute, Gino Cappello was also known for his difficult character and lack of discipline, and obtained two lifetime bans throughout his career; one of those was given in 1952, as Cappello had punched a referee during a summer game. He served 12 months of the suspension before being absolved.

References

External links
Gino Cappello Profile at Magliarossonera.it

1920 births
1990 deaths
Sportspeople from Padua
Italian footballers
Association football forwards
Calcio Padova players
A.C. Milan players
Bologna F.C. 1909 players
Novara F.C. players
Serie A players
Serie B players
Italy international footballers
1950 FIFA World Cup players
1954 FIFA World Cup players
Italy B international footballers
Footballers from Veneto